is a popular Danish reality television program debuting in 1998. In the spring of 1998 TV3 purchased the broadcast rights to air their own version of Expedition Robinson. Following the success of the Swedish version, Denmark was the first country to adopt their own version of the show. The show has proven to be a ratings success since its premiere in 1998.

The name alludes to both Robinson Crusoe and The Swiss Family Robinson, two stories featuring people marooned by shipwrecks.

Format
The Robinson format was developed by Planet 24, a United Kingdom TV production company owned by Charlie Parsons and Bob Geldof. Their company Castaway Television Productions retained the rights to the concept when they sold Planet 24 in 1999. Mark Burnett later licensed the format to create the U.S. show Survivor in 2000.

Sixteen contestants are put into a survival situation and compete in a variety of physical challenges. Early in each season two teams compete but later on the teams are merged and the competitions become individual. At the end of each show one contestant is eliminated from the show by the others in a secret "island council" ballot.

Seasons

References

External links
 https://www.viafree.dk/programmer/reality/robinson-ekspeditionen

 
Danish reality television series
Survivor (franchise)
1998 Danish television series debuts
1990s Danish television series
Danish-language television shows
TV3 (Denmark) original programming